Steven Blake Haxton (born December 17, 1990) is an American para-rower and paracanoeist. He represented the United States at the 2016 and 2020 Summer Paralympics.

Career
Haxton represented the United States at the 2016 Summer Paralympics in the men's single sculls and finished in fourth place with a time of 4:54.25.

Haxton represented the United States at the 2020 Summer Paralympics in the men's VL2 event and won a silver medal.

References

1990 births
Living people
Sportspeople from Columbus, Ohio
American male canoeists
American male rowers
Rowers at the 2016 Summer Paralympics
Paracanoeists at the 2020 Summer Paralympics
Medalists at the 2020 Summer Paralympics
Paralympic medalists in paracanoe
Paralympic silver medalists for the United States
Paralympic rowers of the United States
Paracanoeists of the United States